Euphorbia epithymoides, the cushion spurge, syn. E. polychroma, is a species of flowering plant in the family Euphorbiaceae, native to Libya, Turkey and East, Middle, and Southeast Europe.

The cultivar 'Major' has gained the Royal Horticultural Society's Award of Garden Merit.

References

External links

epithymoides
Plants described in 1762
Taxa named by Carl Linnaeus